Garbage, trash, rubbish, or refuse is waste material that is discarded by humans, usually due to a perceived lack of utility. The term generally does not encompass bodily waste products, purely liquid or gaseous wastes, or toxic waste products. Garbage is commonly sorted and classified into kinds of material suitable for specific kinds of disposal.

Terminology
The word garbage originally meant chicken giblets and other entrails, as can be seen in the 15th century Boke of Kokery, which has a recipe for Garbage.

What constitutes garbage is highly subjective, with some individuals or societies tending to discard things that others find useful or restorable. The words garbage, refuse, rubbish, trash, and waste are generally treated as interchangeable when used to describe "substances or objects which the holder discards or intends or is required to discard". Some of these terms have historic distinctions that are no longer present. In the 1880s, material to be disposed of was divided into four general categories: ashes (derived from the burning of coal or wood), garbage, rubbish, and street-sweepings. This scheme of categorization reduced some of these terms to more specific concepts:

The distinction between terms used to describe wet and dry discarded material "was important in the days when cities slopped garbage to pigs, and needed to have the wet material separated from the dry", but has since dissipated.

Treatment

In urban areas, garbage of all kinds is collected and treated as municipal solid waste; garbage that is discarded in ways that cause it to end up in the environment, rather than in containers or facilities designed to receive garbage, is considered litter. Litter is a form of garbage that has been improperly disposed of, and which therefore enters the environment. Notably, however, only a small fraction of garbage that is generated becomes litter, with the vast majority being disposed of in ways intended to secure it from entering the environment.

History
Humans have been creating garbage throughout history, beginning with bone fragments left over from using animal parts and stone fragments discarded from toolmaking. The degree to which groups of early humans began engaging in agriculture can be estimated by examining the type and quality of animal bones in their garbage. Garbage from prehistoric or pre-civilization humans was often collected into mounds called middens, which might contain things such as "a mix of discarded food, charcoal, shell tools, and broken pottery".

See also
 Garbology (study of modern refuse and trash)
 Landfill

References

Waste